Liujia Township, may refer to:

Liujia Township, Beizhen, a township in Beizhen, Liaoning, China
Liujia Township, Fuchuan County, a township in Fuchuan Yao Autonomous County, Guangxi, China